Orange salad might refer to:

Seafoam salad
Sicilian orange salad